Greenwood is an unincorporated community in Franklin County, in the U.S. state of Pennsylvania.

History
A variant name of Greenwood was "Black's Gap", after Robert Black, a pioneer settler. A post office called Black's Gap was established in 1869, and remained in operation until 1930.

References

Unincorporated communities in Franklin County, Pennsylvania
Unincorporated communities in Pennsylvania